Trevor John Duncan Grant (24 May 1926 – 10 October 1957) was an English cricketer.  Grant was a right-handed opening batsman.  He was born at Charlwood, Surrey.

Grant made a single first-class appearance for Sussex against Hampshire at Dean Park, Bournemouth in the 1946 County Championship.  In Sussex's first-innings, he was dismissed for a duck by Lofty Herman. In their second-innings, he was dismissed for 6 runs by the same bowler.  This was his only major appearance for Sussex.

Outside of cricket, Grant served in the Royal Navy, having attended the Britannia Royal Naval College in 1942.  He died at Shotley Gate, Suffolk on 10 October 1957.

References

External links
Trevor Grant at ESPNcricinfo
Trevor Grant at CricketArchive

1926 births
1957 deaths
People from Mole Valley (district)
English cricketers
Sussex cricketers
Graduates of Britannia Royal Naval College
Royal Navy officers